Althaea officinalis, the marsh mallow or marshmallow, is a species of flowering plant indigenous to Europe, Western Asia and North Africa, which is used in herbalism and as an ornamental plant. A confection made from the root since ancient Egyptian times evolved into today's marshmallow treat, but most modern marshmallow treats no longer contain any marsh-mallow root.

Description
This herbaceous perennial has stems which die down in the autumn, They typically grow , but can reach  and put out only a few lateral branches. They are soft and velvety on both sides, due to a dense covering of stellate hairs. The lilac-pink flowers are shaped like those of the common mallow, but are smaller and of a pale colour, and are either axillary, or in panicles, more often the latter.

The stamens are united into a tube, the anthers, kidney-shaped and one-celled. The flowers are in bloom during August and September, and are followed, as in other species of this order, by the flat, round fruit which are popularly called "cheeses".

The common mallow is frequently called "marsh mallow" in colloquial terms, but the true marsh mallow is distinguished from all the other mallows growing in Great Britain by the numerous divisions of the outer calyx (six to nine cleft), by the hoary down which thickly clothes the stems and foliage, and by the numerous panicles of blush-coloured flowers, paler than the common mallow. The roots are perennial, thick, long and tapering, very tough and pliant, whitish yellow outside, white and fibrous within.

Phytochemicals
Chemical constituents include altheahexacosanyl lactone (n-hexacos-2-enyl-1,5-olide), 2β-hydroxycalamene (altheacalamene) and altheacoumarin glucoside (5,6-dihydroxycoumarin-5-dodecanoate-6β-D-glucopyranoside), along with the known phytoconstituents lauric acid, β-sitosterol and lanosterol.

Uses

Ornamental
Marshmallows are used in gardening as ornamental plants.

Herbal medicine

The leaves, flowers and the root of A. officinalis (marshmallow) have been used in traditional herbal medicine. This use is reflected in the name of the genus, which comes from the Greek , meaning "to heal." The Latin specific epithet officinalis indicates plants with some culinary or medicinal value.

Marshmallow is traditionally used as relief for irritation of mucous membranes, including use as a gargle for mouth and throat ulcers and gastric ulcers. In Russia, the root syrup is sold without a prescription by pharmacies, with intent to treat respiratory and digestive ailments.

Culinary
Most of the mallows have been used as food, and are mentioned by early classic writers with this connection. Mallow was an edible vegetable among the Romans; a dish of marsh mallow was one of their delicacies. Prospero Alpini stated in 1592 that a plant of the mallow kind was eaten by the Egyptians. Many of the poorer inhabitants of Syria subsisted for weeks on herbs, of which marshmallow is one of the most common. When boiled first and fried with onions and butter, the roots are said to form a palatable dish, and in times of scarcity consequent upon the failure of the crops, this plant, which grows there in great abundance, is collected heavily as a foodstuff.

The young leaves can be cooked. The flower buds can be pickled. The roots can be peeled, sliced, boiled and sweetened to make candy. Water used to boil any part of the plant can be used as an egg white substitute.

The root extract (halawa extract) is sometimes used as flavoring in the making of halva.

References

Further reading

External links

 
 Connecticut Botanical Society: Althaea officinalis 
 Botanical.com: Mallows including Althaea officinalis
 USDA Plants profile: Althaea officinalis

Malveae
Medicinal plants of Africa
Demulcents
Plants used in traditional Chinese medicine
Plants described in 1753
Taxa named by Carl Linnaeus
Saponaceous plants